Algeria participated at the 2017 Summer Universiade in Taipei, Taiwan with 33 competitors in 3 sport.

Athletics

Men

Track Events

Field Events

Women

Track Events

Field Events

Judo

Men

Women

Swimming

Men

Women

References

Nations at the 2017 Summer Universiade
Algeria at the Summer Universiade
2017 in Algerian sport

External links
Universiade Taipei 2017